Aqueduct Walk is a community park in The Bronx, New York City located between Kingsbridge Road and West Tremont Avenue. It spans over two zip codes (10453 and 10468) and two Bronx Community boards (CB5 and CB7). Its facilities include basketball courts, restrooms, playground and water sprinklers. The park is a portion of the Old Croton Aqueduct.

History 
Reconstruction of the Aqueduct Walk Plaza began design in 2015 and completed construction in 2019. Captain Roscoe Brown, Ph.D. Plaza is a section of the park that was dedicated in 2018 to Roscoe C. Brown Jr., a Tuskegee Airman, United States Army Air Forces veteran and former president of Bronx Community College.

Civic groups 
The Friends of Aqueduct Walk (F.O.A.W.) community coalition volunteers advocate for retaining the parks history, continued maintenance and public programming. During the Covid-19 pandemic, the Friends of Aqueduct Walk collaborated with Photoville and Photo Wings on a public art exhibit that displayed photos and history of the community of the Aqueduct Walk neighborhood. In addition, they have hosted programming in relation to the exhibit as well as several park clean-ups.

References

See also 
 Croton Aqueduct

Parks in the Bronx
Kingsbridge, Bronx
University Heights, Bronx